You too or You Too may refer to:

Tu quoque (Latin for "you too"), an informal logical fallacy
"You Too", a 2013 song by Para One

See also

U2 (disambiguation)
"You Two", a song from the 1968 musical film Chitty Chitty Bang Bang
To You (disambiguation)